The Bahrain national beach soccer team represents Bahrain in international beach soccer competitions and is controlled by the BHR Football Association, the governing body for football in the Bahrain.

Bahrain qualified for the 2006 world cup as AFC Group winners. Subsequently, Bahrain participated in the 2006 World Cup tournament, ultimately reaching the quarterfinals before being eliminated by Portugal.

Current squad

Coach:  Gustavo Zlocewick

Achievements
AFC Beach Soccer Championship: 2006 Winners
FIFA World Beach Soccer Championship: 2006 Quarter Finalist's

Tournament records

FIFA Beach Soccer World Cup

 1995 – N/A
 1996 – N/A
 1997 – N/A
 1998 – N/A
 1999 – N/A
 2000 – N/A
 2001 – N/A
 2002 – N/A
 2003 – N/A
 2004 – N/A
 2005 – N/A
 2006 – Quarter-Finals
 2007 – Failed to Qualify
 2008 – Failed to Qualify
 2009 – Group Stage

AFC Beach Soccer Championship

 2006 – Winners
 2007 – 4th
 2008 – Did not compete
 2009 – 2nd
 2011 – Quarter-Finals

External links
Bahrain Squad FIFA
Bahrain v Italy World Cup 2006

Football in Bahrain
Asian national beach soccer teams